Greenlawn, also known as the Outten Davis House and William Brady House, was a historic home located at Middletown, New Castle County, Delaware. It was built about 1810, and radically altered about 1860.  It was a two-story, five bay, brick dwelling with cross-gable roof with dormers. It had a rear brick ell with attached wing. It featured a three-bay front porch, large brackets, a widow's walk on the roof, and ornate chimney caps.  It was originally built in the Late Georgian style, then modified with Late Victorian details.

It was listed on the National Register of Historic Places in 1973 and demolished in about 1985.

References

External links

Historic American Buildings Survey in Delaware
Houses on the National Register of Historic Places in Delaware
Georgian architecture in Delaware
Victorian architecture in Delaware
Houses completed in 1810
Houses in New Castle County, Delaware
National Register of Historic Places in New Castle County, Delaware